is a pseudonymous Japanese manga artist. Their notable works include the post-apocalyptic iyashikei manga Girls' Last Tour and the four-panel surreal comedy manga Shimeji Simulation.

Biography 
Tsukumizu had been reading extensively since they were in primary school, and read novels all through upper secondary. They cite Haruki Murakami's Norwegian Wood and Dance Dance Dance, and Kaori Ekuni's Kirakira Hikaru as having influenced the themes behind Girls' Last Tour.

In upper secondary, they started to become interested in anime, and began drawing moe in their third year. This interest would bloom to encompass manga as well. Tsukumizu attended the Aichi University of Education, and wished to study painting to become an art teacher. At that temporal juncture, they only saw drawing manga as a hobby.

As a post-secondary student, Tsukumizu loved war movies, especially Saving Private Ryan. The Kettenkrad that appears in Girls' Last Tour is a homage to the movie.

In 2013, they published a Touhou Project dōjinshi, Flan Wants to Die, about an immortal yōkai named Flan who longs to die.

In their second year of post-secondary, Tsukumizu began drawing manga and was invited to a manga circle by a friend. They regularly uploaded their work on the Internet, and this caught the eye of someone at the publishing company Shinchosha. Their first commercially published work was Girls' Last Tour, which was adapted into an anime in 2017.

Their next major series, Shimeji Simulation, began serialization in Media Factory's Comic Cune magazine on 26 January 2019.

Works 
Flan Wants to Die (2013)
Girls' Last Tour (2014–2018)
Shimeji Simulation (2019–present)

References

External links 

 

Living people
Manga artists
Year of birth missing (living people)
Pseudonymous artists